Fathi Arafat (January 11, 1933 – December 1, 2004), born in Cairo, was a Palestinian physician and a founder and long-term chairman of the Palestine Red Crescent Society. He studied medicine at Cairo University from 1950 until 1957 and thereafter practiced as a pediatrician in Cairo, Kuwait and Jordan. He was a younger brother of Palestinian president Yasser Arafat.

Arafat became a member of the Palestinian National Council in 1967. From 1968 he was also President of Palestine General Union of Physicians and Pharmacists. He served as Chief Delegate for Palestine to the World Health Organization in Geneva from 1982 onwards. From 1992 he was President of the Palestine Academy for Science and Technology (formerly Palestine Academy for Scientific Research) and President of the Palestine Higher Health Council.

He died in Cairo on December 1, 2004, from stomach cancer, less than a month after the death of Yasser Arafat.

References

1933 births
2004 deaths
Deaths from stomach cancer
Palestinian pediatricians
Physicians from Cairo
Deaths from cancer in Egypt
Presidents of the Palestine Academy for Science and Technology